Hậu Giang is a province located in the Mekong Delta region in the southern part of Vietnam. Vị Thanh is the capital.

History
Until the end of the Vietnam War in 1975, the province included the city of Cần Thơ which was the provincial capital. In 1975, the province was renamed Cần Thơ province, with the city of Cần Thơ still the capital. In late 2004, Cần Thơ and some surrounding cities became Cần Thơ municipality (Thành Phố Cần Thơ). The remainder of Cần Thơ province became Hậu Giang province.

Hậu Giang has an industrial zone of 902 ha. There are 120 km of national roads: National Highway 61 (which leads to National Highway 1, going through Cần Thơ Municipality on the Hậu River to Ho Chi Minh City), and water connections by canal and river to the Hậu River.

An estimated 80% of the province will be underwater following a  sea level rise relative to the current land elevation, which is subsiding over time.

Administrative divisions
Hậu Giang is subdivided into eight district-level sub-divisions:

 5 districts:
 Châu Thành 
 Châu Thành A
 Long Mỹ 
 Phụng Hiệp 
 Vị Thủy

 1 district-level town:
 Long Mỹ
 2 provincial cities:
 Vị Thanh (capital)
 Ngã Bảy

They are further subdivided into 11 commune-level towns (or townships), 51 communes, and 13 wards.

References

External links

 
Provinces of Vietnam